Bedotia longianalis is a species of Madagascar rainbowfish endemic to Madagascar.  Its natural habitat is the lower reaches of rivers and its range extends from the Ifontsy to the Anove and it is also found on Île Sainte-Marie, in north-eastern Madagascar. It was described in 1914 by Jacques Pellegrin from a type collected from a market in Mahambo.

References

longianalis
Freshwater fish of Madagascar
Taxonomy articles created by Polbot
Fish described in 1914